FC Dynamo GTS Stavropol was an association football club from Stavropol, Russia, founded in 1986. It last played in the Russian Professional Football League (which is the highest level the club has ever achieved). In 2011, the remains of dissolved FC Krasnodar-2000 were integrated in the club. It is formally a separate club from the club that participated in professional competition previously as FC Dynamo Stavropol. Before the 2015–16 season, it was renamed to FC Dynamo Stavropol.

Club name history
1986–1991: FC Signal Izobilny
1992–1995: FC Dynamo Izobilny
1996–1999: FC Signal Izobilny
2000–2003: FC Spartak-Kavkaztransgaz Izobilny
2004: FC Kavkaztransgaz Izobilny
2005–2006: FC Kavkaztransgaz Ryzdvyany
2007–2013: FC Kavkaztransgaz-2005 Ryzdvyany
2013–2014: FC Gazprom transgaz Stavropol Ryzdvyany
2014–2015 : FC Dynamo GTS Stavropol
2015– : FC Dynamo Stavropol

References

External links
Official website
Page at 2liga.ru

Association football clubs established in 1986
Football clubs in Russia
Sport in Stavropol
FC Dynamo Stavropol
1986 establishments in Russia